Dance-2-Nite is the dance variety show of ABS-CBN network from 1987 to 1988. It is the counterpart of IBC's Dance Tonight.

See also
List of shows previously aired by ABS-CBN

ABS-CBN original programming
1987 Philippine television series debuts
1988 Philippine television series endings
Philippine variety television shows